Khayat, Khayyat is an Arabic-language  occupational surname, literally meaning "tailor". Notable people with the surname include:

People

Bill Khayat (born 1973), American football coach
David Khayat (born 1956), French oncologist
Ed Khayat (born 1935), American football player
Jana Khayat, British businesswoman
Jean Khayat (born 1942), Tunisian Olympic fencer
Mirna Khayat, Lebanese music video director
Nadir Khayat, known by the stage name RedOne, Morocco-born Swedish producer and songwriter
Robert Khayat (born 1938), American academic, Chancellor of the University of Mississippi
Khayat (singer), Ukrainian singer
Audishu V Khayyath, patriarch of the Chaldean Catholic Church in 1894–1899

See also
Al Khayat

Arabic-language surnames
Occupational surnames